Book Three: Fire is the third and final season of Avatar: The Last Airbender, an American animated television series created by Michael Dante DiMartino and Bryan Konietzko. The series stars Zach Tyler Eisen, Mae Whitman, Jack DeSena, Jessie Flower, Dante Basco, Dee Bradley Baker, Greg Baldwin (replacing Mako Iwamatsu), Grey DeLisle, and Mark Hamill as the main character voices.

The final season focuses once again on Avatar Aang, now seeking to learn Firebending, and his friends Katara, Sokka, and Toph, who must defeat the tyrannical Fire Lord Ozai before the arrival of Sozin's Comet. Concurrently, it also follows the story of Prince Zuko, who is finally welcomed back into the Fire Nation after betraying his uncle Iroh and helping his sister Azula conquer Ba Sing Se in Book Two.

Book Three: Fire premiered on Nickelodeon on September 21, 2007. It consisted of 21 episodes and concluded with the four-part series finale "Sozin's Comet" on July 19, 2008. Like the previous seasons, it received critical acclaim, with many praising it as a satisfying conclusion to the series. 
Between October 30, 2007 and September 16, 2008, Paramount Home Entertainment released four DVD volumes and a complete boxset.

The season was followed by the comic trilogy series The Promise which is set one year after the four-part series finale. 

A sequel series, The Legend of Korra, aired on Nickelodeon from April 14, 2012 to December 19, 2014. Set seventy years after the finale, the series follows Avatar Korra of the Southern Water Tribe, the successor of Avatar Aang.


Episodes

<onlyinclude>
{{Episode table |background=#660000 |overall=5 |season=5 |title=24 |aux2=10 |director=14 |writer=17 |airdate=15 |prodcode=7 |viewers=3 |aux2T=Animated by |prodcodeR= |episodes=

{{Episode list/sublist|Avatar: The Last Airbender (season 3)
|EpisodeNumber=61
|EpisodeNumber2=21
|Title= Sozin's Comet, Part 4: Avatar Aang
|Aux2 = JM Animation
|WrittenBy= Michael Dante DiMartino and Bryan Konietzko
|DirectedBy= Joaquim Dos Santos
|OriginalAirDate=
|ProdCode=321
|Viewers=5.59
|ShortSummary=The Order of the White Lotus liberates Ba Sing Se, while Sokka, Suki and Toph disable the Fire Nation attack armada. Katara takes over fighting Azula, eventually immobilizing her in ice to chain her to a grate in the ground, then rushes to heal Zuko. Zuko and Katara watch with pity as Azula suffers a full mental breakdown. Ozai accidentally causes Aang to enter the Avatar State by knocking him into a rock that pierces his lightning wound, unlocking his chakras. Aang easily overwhelms Ozai, yet still refuses to kill him, instead harnessing "energybending", learned from the lion-turtle, to permanently strip Ozai of his firebending abilities and render him powerless. In an epilogue sequence set some days later, newly-appointed Fire Lord Zuko declares the war over. He and Mai reconcile, and he confronts his father in prison, angrily asking where his mother is. Ty Lee is shown to have joined the Kyoshi Warriors while teaching them chi-blocking from prison. Some time later, "Team Avatar" celebrate together at Iroh's tea shop in Ba Sing Se. Slipping out to share a quiet moment together, Aang and Katara embrace and kiss under the sunset.

Note: The series is canonically followed by The Promise, [[Avatar: The Last Airbender – The Search|The Search]], The Rift, Smoke and Shadow,  North and South and Imbalance  graphic novel trilogies. In animation, it is followed by the sequel series The Legend of Korra, taking place around 70 years later and focusing on the next Avatar.
|LineColor=660000
}}
}}</onlyinclude>

Production
The season was produced by Nickelodeon Animation Studio and aired on Nickelodeon, both of which are owned by Viacom. The season's executive producers and co-creators were Michael Dante DiMartino and Bryan Konietzko, who worked alongside head writer and co-producer Aaron Ehasz. Most of the individual episodes were directed by Ethan Spaulding, Lauren MacMullan and Giancarlo Volpe. Episodes were written by a team of writers, which consisted of Aaron Ehasz, Elizabeth Welch, Tim Hedrick, and John O'Bryan, along with creators DiMartino and Konietzko.

The season's music was composed by "The Track Team", which consists of Jeremy Zuckerman and Benjamin Wynn, who were known to the show's creators because Zuckerman was Konietzko's roommate.

Cast
All of the central characters generally remained the same: Zach Tyler Eisen voices Aang, Mae Whitman voices Katara, Jack DeSena voices Sokka, Jessie Flower voices Toph, Dante Basco voices Zuko, Dee Bradley Baker voices Appa and Momo, and Grey DeLisle voices Azula. 

Additionally, Mark Hamill reprises his role as Fire Lord Ozai in a greater capacity after having minor appearances throughout the first and second seasons of the series,
while Greg Baldwin now voices Iroh due to Mako Iwamatsu's death.

Reception
The season received critical acclaim, winning a 2008 Peabody Award. Jamie S. Rich from DVD Talk remarked, "In addition to the solid writing, Avatar the Last Airbender [sic] also has amazing animation. The character designs, with its roots in classic Asian folklore, are colorful and inventive, and the overall animation is smooth and consistently executed". Jamie S. Rich wrote in another review:

Henrik Batallones, a BuddyTV Staff Columnist, also noted the wide variety of positive reviews from the press for the series finale, noting that sources such as The New York Times and Toon Zone gave Avatar: The Last Airbender "glowing reviews".

The season also received praise for its video, redemption of Zuko, and sound quality. Nick Lyons from DVD Talk felt that the video quality appeared better than previous seasons, which had also garnered additional awards. He also remarks that the sound is "spot on...as per usual." At the 2008 Annie Awards, the season won "Best Animated Television Production for Children". At the same Annie Awards, Joaquim Dos Santos won the "Best Directing in an Animated Television Production" caption for his directing in "Into the Inferno". Joaquim Dos Santos also gave Avatar: The Last Airbender a nomination at Annecy 2008 for his work with "The Day of Black Sun Part 2: The Eclipse". Additionally, music editor and composer Jeremy Zuckerman and the sound editing team were nominated a Golden Reel award for "Best Sound Editing in a Television Animation" for their work in "Avatar Aang".

DVD releases
The first three DVD volumes contain five episodes each, and the fourth volume contains six. A later boxed set contained all four volumes. The first DVD was released on October 30, 2007, and the complete boxed set was released on September 16, 2008. They are released by Paramount Home Entertainment. Each of the individual Season Three DVDs also comes complete with an exclusive comic book. The Complete Book 3 Collection DVD includes the following DVD extras: Inside Sozin's Comet: Exclusive Four-Part Commentary by Creators, The Women of Avatar: The Last Airbender, Book 3 Finale Pencil Test Animation and Into the Fire Nation'' at San Diego Comic-Con. The boxed set was released on February 1, 2010 in the United Kingdom.

Footnotes
1. Production code format taken from the commentary for "Sozin's Comet Part 1: The Phoenix King"

References
General

 
 

Specific

Avatar: The Last Airbender
2007 American television seasons
2008 American television seasons

fr:Liste des épisodes d'Avatar, le dernier maître de l'air#Livre Trois : Le Feu